Iakovos Kiseoglou (born 17 September 1967) is a Greek sailor. He competed in the Star event at the 1992 Summer Olympics.

References

External links
 

1967 births
Living people
Greek male sailors (sport)
Olympic sailors of Greece
Sailors at the 1992 Summer Olympics – Star
Sailors (sport) from Athens